José Javier Eguiguren Ríofrío (3 December 1816 – 1884) was acting President of Ecuador from 6 October 1875 to 9 December 1875.

He was Minister of Finance from 1870 to 1871 and from 1874 to 1875.

References

External links
 Official Website of the Ecuadorian Government about the country President's History

1816 births
1884 deaths
Presidents of Ecuador
Ecuadorian Ministers of Finance